The black monarch (Symposiachrus axillaris) is a species of bird in the family Monarchidae.
It is found in New Guinea.
Its natural habitats are subtropical or tropical moist lowland forest and subtropical or tropical moist montane forest.

Taxonomy and systematics
This species was formerly placed in the genus Monarcha until moved to Symposiachrus in 2009. Alternate names include the black monarch flycatcher, fantail monarch and fantailed monarch.

Subspecies
There are two subspecies recognized:
 S. a. axillaris - (Salvadori, 1876): Found in north-western New Guinea
 S. a. fallax - (Ramsay, EP, 1885): Originally described as a separate species in the genus Rhipidura. Found in west-central to south-eastern New Guinea and Goodenough Island (D'Entrecasteaux Archipelago)

References

black monarch
Birds of New Guinea
black monarch
Taxonomy articles created by Polbot